Phaeozona is a monotypic moth genus of the family Noctuidae erected by George Hampson in 1910. Its only species, Phaeozona purpurascens, was first described by George Thomas Bethune-Baker in 1906. It is found in New Guinea.

References

Acontiinae
Monotypic moth genera